Nikolai Reek VR I/2, VR II/2, VR II/3 (born Nikolai Bazykov;  in Tallinn, Governorate of Estonia – 8 May 1942 Ussollag, Perm Oblast, Soviet Union) was the Estonian military commander during the Estonian War of Independence.

In 1910, he graduated from Chuguyev Military Academy. He participated in World War I, in 1917 graduated Imperial Nicholas Military Academy. Reek joined Estonian units in 1917 and was Chief of Staff until dissolution of these units. After that he organized the Defence League in Virumaa. In Estonian Liberation War Reek was firstly commander of 5th regiment at Viru Front, in January 1919 he became Chief of Staff of 1st Division, in April he became Chief of Staff of 3rd Division. Reek played important role in winning war against Baltische Landeswehr. In September 1919 he achieved the rank of colonel and served as Chief of Staff of Viru Front. After war Reek repeatedly served in positions of Chief of Staff, Minister of Defense and Commander of 2nd Division. At 1938 Reek was promoted to lieutenant general. In 1941 Soviet occupation authorities arrested Reek imprisoned in Usollag and the following year executed him.

Reek is recipient of the Latvian military Order of Lāčplēsis, 2nd class.

See also 
Estonian War of Independence
Freikorps in the Baltic

References

Nikolai Reek
 Ülo Kaevats et al. 2000. Eesti entsüklopeedia 14. Tallinn: Eesti Entsüklopeediakirjastus,

External links

1890 births
1942 deaths
People from Tallinn
People from Kreis Harrien
Defence Ministers of Estonia
Estonian lieutenant generals
Imperial Russian Army officers
Russian military personnel of World War I
Estonian military personnel of the Estonian War of Independence
Recipients of the Cross of Liberty (Estonia)
Recipients of the Military Order of the Cross of the Eagle, Class I
Recipients of the Order of the White Star, 1st Class
Recipients of the Order of Lāčplēsis, 2nd class
Recipients of the Order of Lāčplēsis, 3rd class
Estonian people executed by the Soviet Union
People who died in the Gulag